The canton of Lalinde is an administrative division of the Dordogne department, southwestern France. Its borders were modified at the French canton reorganisation which came into effect in March 2015. Its seat is in Lalinde.

It consists of the following communes:

Alles-sur-Dordogne
Badefols-sur-Dordogne
Baneuil
Bayac
Beaumontois-en-Périgord
Biron
Bouillac
Bourniquel
Le Buisson-de-Cadouin
Calès
Capdrot
Cause-de-Clérans
Couze-et-Saint-Front
Gaugeac
Lalinde
Lanquais
Lavalade
Liorac-sur-Louyre
Lolme
Marsalès
Mauzac-et-Grand-Castang
Molières
Monpazier
Monsac
Montferrand-du-Périgord
Naussannes
Pezuls
Pontours
Pressignac-Vicq
Rampieux
Saint-Agne
Saint-Avit-Rivière
Saint-Avit-Sénieur
Saint-Capraise-de-Lalinde
Saint-Cassien
Sainte-Croix
Sainte-Foy-de-Longas
Saint-Félix-de-Villadeix
Saint-Marcel-du-Périgord
Saint-Marcory
Saint-Romain-de-Monpazier
Soulaures
Urval
Varennes
Verdon
Vergt-de-Biron

References

Cantons of Dordogne